Jazz Meets Folk was an Australian television series which aired on 1964. It was a music series aired in a half-hour time-slot on ABC. It was produced in Sydney, and hosted by Alan Dean; among its featured musicians were the Bryce Rohde Quintet, Don Burrows "plus six", and folk singer Marian Henderson.

See also
Trad Jazz (1962-1963)
Look Who's Dropped In (1957-1958)
Sweet and Low (1959)
Australian All Star Jazz Band (1959)

References

External links
Jazz Meets Folk on IMDb

1964 Australian television series debuts
1964 Australian television series endings
Australian music television series
Australian Broadcasting Corporation original programming
Black-and-white Australian television shows
English-language television shows